This article lists the presidents of the Government of New Caledonia since 1999, after the Nouméa Accord was signed in 1998. The President is often from the largest party in the Congress of New Caledonia, though the government itself is made up of cabinet ministers from all parties in Congress, allocated proportionally based on the number of MPs from each party.

List of officeholders

See also

 Politics of New Caledonia
 List of colonial and departmental heads of New Caledonia

External links
 

New Caledonia
Government of New Caledonia
Politics of New Caledonia